The 32nd Directors Guild of America Awards, honoring the outstanding directorial achievements in film and television in 1979, were presented on March 15, 1980 at the Beverly Hilton. The award honoring commercial directors was given out for the first time at this ceremony.

Winners and nominees

Film

Television

Commercials

Frank Capra Achievement Award
 Emmett Emerson

References

External links
 

Directors Guild of America Awards
1979 film awards
1979 television awards
Direct
Direct
Directors
Directors Guild of America Awards
Directors Guild of America Awards